Schistura carbonaria is a species of ray-finned fish in the stone loach genus Schistura. It is found in central Vietnam in some coastal drainage systems, from the Ve River to the Qang Tri River, and the River Xe Kong, in the Xe Kong its range may extend into Laos. It can be found in medium-sized rivers and streams which have a strong current over a substrate of rocks and gravel.

References 

carbonaria
Fish described in 2001
Taxa named by Jörg Freyhof